Euell Ferguson Montgomery (November 9, 1915 – October 9, 2004) was a provincial politician from Alberta, Canada. He served as a member of the Legislative Assembly of Alberta from 1961 to 1967 sitting with the governing Social Credit caucus.

Political career
Montgomery ran as the Social Credit candidate in a by-election held in the Peace River provincial electoral district on October 26, 1961. He won the seat with a landslide of almost 65% of the popular vote to hold it for his party.

Montgomery ran for a second term in office in the 1963 Alberta general election. He held his majority from the by-election winning over 60% of the vote defeating two other candidates. He retired from politics at dissolution of the legislature in 1967.

References

External links
Legislative Assembly of Alberta Members Listing

1915 births
2004 deaths
Alberta Social Credit Party MLAs